Scopula natalensis is a moth of the family Geometridae. It is found in South Africa.

References

Endemic moths of South Africa
Moths described in 1915
natalensis
Moths of Africa